The Shanmen, also known as the Gate of Three Liberations, is the most important gate of a Chinese Chan Buddhist temple.

Etymology

The origins of the name "sanmen" are debated. One theory is that "Shanmen" takes its literal meaning of "Mountain Gate", because temples were traditionally built in forested mountain areas where Chan monks could seclude away from secular life. Another suggests that during various episodes of suppression of Buddhism in Chinese history, monks moved their monasteries deep into the mountains, and later built gates at the foot of the mountain to guide pilgrims to the temples. A further theory is that "Shanmen" is a corruption of "Sanmen", or "Three Gates", referring to the "three gateways" to liberations.() in the Dharma - the "Kongmen" (emptiness liberation), "wuxiangmen" (no-aspects liberation) and "wuyuanmen" (desireless liberation).

The latter view correlates with the traditional structure of Chan temples which included three gateways, said to symbolise the three gateways.

Architectural styles

Historic Shanmens in China are either a gateway of the paifang style, or a more substantial building, typically with three archways. Where a substantial building is used, the two side gateways might be simplified to arched or circular windows, leaving only the middle gate for access. The gate building may be called the "Hall of Three Liberations" or "Hall of the Mountain Gate". 

Traditionally, if the Shanmen takes the form of a gate building, statues of two guardians of Buddhist law are erected in that hall as guardians of the entrance (identified as "Heng and Ha" (the "A-un" Nio in Japanese). This is the arrangement at Jietai Temple in Beijing. 

In some Chan temples, the Shanmen building is combined with the Hall of the Four Heavenly Kings, so that the Four Heavenly Kings serve as guardians of the gateway to the monastery. In other Chan sect temples, the Shanmen building is combined with the Maitreya Hall, with a statue of the Maitreya Buddha erected in the centre of the hall. This is the arrangement seen at Shaolin Temple and Longhua Temple. Yet other Chan temples combine both the Maitreya Hall and the Hall of the Four Heavenly King with the Shanmen, so that the entrance building also features the statue of the Maitreya Buddha at the centre as well as the Four Heavenly Kings on the sides. This is the arrangement at Lingyin Temple.

References

Further reading

External links

Chinese Buddhist architecture